The Moeopsyllini form a flea tribe in the family Pulicidae.

References

External links

Pulicidae
Insect tribes